William Frederick Langford (7 August 1896 in Gravenhurst, Ontario – 21 January 1973) was a Canadian rower who competed in the 1924 Summer Olympics. In 1924 he won the silver medal as crew member of the Canadian boat in the eights event.

References

External links
William Langford's profile at databaseOlympics
William Langford's profile at Sports Reference.com

1896 births
1973 deaths
People from Gravenhurst, Ontario
Canadian male rowers
Olympic rowers of Canada
Olympic silver medalists for Canada
Rowers at the 1924 Summer Olympics
Olympic medalists in rowing
Medalists at the 1924 Summer Olympics